Manzherok (Man-Ĵürek) is a rural locality (a selo) in Manzherokskoye Rural Settlement of Mayminsky District, the Altai Republic, Russia. The population was 1567 as of 2016. There are 44 streets.

Geography 
Manzherok is located on the Katun River, 31 km southwest of Mayma (the district's administrative centre) by road. Ozyorny is the nearest rural locality.

References 

Rural localities in Mayminsky District